Christianity and fringed garments refers to the mention of fringed garments in Christian sources, and to their use in Christian ritual, and to the possible connection to Jewish tzitzit and tallit.

New Testament

 says:

 similarly says:

Christian interpreters have connected these healings that the New Testament records taking place through Jesus' tzitzit with : 

Christian interpreters have stated that this is a messianic prophecy fulfilled by Jesus because the Hebrew word "corners" (kanafim, כנפים), used in the Torah  for the place tzitzit are to be attached, literally means "wings". Therefore, interpreters say, the suffering woman and the others who were infirm found healing in Jesus' "wings". Interpreters also say Jesus could be referred to by the name "sun of righteousness" because he is considered, in New Testament scripture, to be perfectly righteous and without sin.

 also has Jesus saying:

The common interpretation of this statement is that Jesus thereby explained that one should not do the commands of God in such a way as to be seen as more righteous and more zealous by others, similar to teachings found in the Discourse on ostentation. In this case, this motivation was evident in the Pharisees to whom he spoke.

The Bauer lexicon, 3rd ed., 1979, includes this entry: 

Onkelos the proselyte, in his Aramaic translation of the Pentateuch, uses the same Greek loanword, krūspedīn for the biblical word tzitzit in Numbers 15:38, and which, in Jewish custom, has the connotation of tassels.

In practice
While much of traditional Christianity has not considered Torah commands such as tzitzit applicable to Christians, there are Torah-submissive Christians who wear tzitzit. Like Karaites, Torah-submissive Christians generally do not feel bound by Jewish oral law, so tzitzit may vary in appearance and may contain blue which is not halakhically derived. However, because of practicality and convenience, traditionally Jewish tzitziot and tallits are often used.

Liturgical use
In Christian liturgy, the stole and other vestments worn by priests and bishops traditionally have fringes on the edge, in remembrance of the Old Testament prescriptions.

In the Eastern Orthodox Church, when the priest or bishop puts on his stole he reads a prayer taken from the Psalms of Degrees: "Blessed is God Who poureth out His grace upon His priests, like unto the precious ointment on the head, which runneth down upon the beard, even the beard of Aaron, which runneth down upon the fringe of his raiment." (Cf. Psalm 133).

See also
 Biblical law in Christianity
 New Testament

References

External links
 New Advent Catholic Encyclopedia: Fringes

Christianity and Judaism
Byzantine Rite
Judaism in the New Testament